Lok Nath Sharma is an Indian politician. He was elected to the Sikkim Legislative Assembly from Gyalshing-Barnyak in the 2019 Sikkim Legislative Assembly election as a member of the Sikkim Krantikari Morcha. He is Minister of Food security, Agriculture, Horticulture & Cash crops, Animal Husbandry, Livestock fisheries & Veterinary services, Information, public relations and Printing in P. S. Golay Cabinet.

References

1973 births
Living people
Sikkim Krantikari Morcha politicians
Sikkim Democratic Front politicians
People from Gyalshing district
Sikkim MLAs 2019–2024